, is a 1996 3D-based fighting game developed by Konami Computer Entertainment Tokyo and published by Konami. It is the first 3D-based fighting game created by Konami. It is also a straight-to-console release, without an arcade counterpart.

Gameplay
It is a 3D fighting game, which features 8 playable characters. There is also a story mode with role playing game elements. Story mode includes short anime cutscenes and dialogue between battle. Defeating enemies in this mode rewards players with up to 200 potential unique items.

There are several gameplay modes:

Story Mode: The player moves across the world map as a chibi character and, upon encountering CPU characters, the scene transitions into a battle. After knocking out the last boss, Dragless, the player receives a separate ending.
VS Mode
Time Attack Mode (Hidden)
Collection Mode (Hidden): This is the so-called special feature mode of the game. In this mode, the player can gain access to hidden costumes and stages by collecting various items from replaying battles. The items can be acquired through completing specific requirements (such as winning under 1 second, performing a general attack as the finishing blow, and double KO the CPU opponent) or by completing the collection of all 208 items.

Fighters

Default Fighters (can be used across all modes)
 (Voiced by: Mariko Kouda)
 (Voiced by: Yuri Shiratori)
 (Voiced by: Junko Iwao)
 (Voiced by: Shō Hayami)
 (Voiced by: Ryōtarō Okiayu)
 (Voiced by: Toshiyuki Morikawa)
 (Voiced by: Yuri Amano)
 (Voiced by: Yuri Shiratori)

Imposter Fighter (that disguises as a subordinate of Dragless)
(Risa Atago is Misa's wild older sister) (Voiced by: Yuri Amano)

Secret Fighters (Upon satisfying certain requirements in the game, these fighters become usable in all modes, with the exception of story mode.)
 (Voiced by: Satomi Kōrogi)
 (a.k.a. Mitsuru Gongōin) (Voiced by: Kenichi Ogata (voice actor))
 (Voiced by: Norio Wakamoto) and is also the boss of the game
K.O.J. (a.k.a. Shirogane Hirō) (Voiced by: Shōzō Iizuka)

Reception 
Weekly Famitsu gave it a score of 25/40.

References

External links

1996 video games
3D fighting games
Japan-exclusive video games
Konami games
Multiplayer video games
PlayStation (console) games
PlayStation (console)-only games
Video games scored by Akira Yamaoka
Video games developed in Japan